Mathew J. Muratore is a member of the Massachusetts House of Representatives since January 2015. A resident of Plymouth, Massachusetts, he was elected as a Republican to represent the 1st Plymouth district. Muratore is a former Plymouth selectman.

See also
 2019–2020 Massachusetts legislature
 2021–2022 Massachusetts legislature

References

Republican Party members of the Massachusetts House of Representatives
People from Plymouth, Massachusetts
Living people
21st-century American politicians
Year of birth missing (living people)